Godson is a surname. Notable people with the surname include:

 Dean Godson, British journalist
 Francis Godson (1864-1953), Methodist minister in Barbados
 John Godson (born 1970), Polish parliamentarian
 Richard Godson (1797–1849), member of Parliament for Kidderminster, England